Louisiana is a 1947 American drama film film directed by Phil Karlson and starring Jimmie Davis, Margaret Lindsay and John Gallaudet. Davis, a singer and Governor of Louisiana, came to Karlson, wanting to be in movies and Monogram Pictures agreed to finance one based on his life. Karlson says the film helped Davis get re-elected.

Synopsis
The music-loving fourteen-year-old son of a Louisiana sharecropper determines to get a good education. He goes on to enjoy success as a gospel singer and culminates his rise by being elected Governor.

Cast
 Jimmie Davis as Jimmie Davis
 Margaret Lindsay as 	Alvern Adams
 John Gallaudet as Charlie Mitchell
 Freddie Stewart as Freddie Stewart
 Dottye Brown as 	Laura
 Ralph Reed as Jimmie Davis as a Boy 
 Russell Hicks as Fred Astor
 Lee 'Lasses' White as 	Old Timer
 John Harmon as 	Steve
 Tristram Coffin as 	Tomlins
 Eddy Waller as 	Mr. Davis
 Mary Field as 	Mrs. Davis
 Joseph Crehan as 	Neilson
 Charles Lane as 	McCormack

References

External links

Louisiana at TCMDB

1947 films
American drama films
Monogram Pictures films
Films directed by Phil Karlson
1947 drama films
American black-and-white films
1940s English-language films
1940s American films